The 2022–23 Hazfi Cup is the 36th season of the Iranian football knockout competition. The champion of this competition will get a license to participate in the Super Cup and the AFC Champions League next season.

Nassaji is the defending champion of this season's Iranian Hazfi Cup as they defeat Aluminium Arak in last season's final match.

Qualified teams 
A total of 96 teams are eligible to participate in the 2022–23 Hazfi Cup according to competition regulations. The teams were divided into four main groups: Teams of Pro league, Azadegan league, 2nd Division, Provincial Leagues. The teams from Pro League and Azadegan League have to participate in the competition, but the teams from 2nd Division and provincial champions can refuse to participate. The table below shows all of the eligible teams and the withdrawn teams are shown in italic.

Schedule 
The schedule of the competition is as follows.

First stage

First round 
Fixures excluded from Iran League Organisation's Website.
Results excluded from Hazfi Cup Website.

Second round 

Fixures excluded from Iran League Organisation's Website.
Results excluded from Hazfi Cup Website.

Third round 

Fixures excluded from Iran League Organisation's Website.
Omid Vahdat Mashhad has failed to participate in the tournament due to disqualification from Azadegan League.

Second stage

Round of 32 (4th Round)

Round of 16 (5th Round)

Quarter Final (6th Round)

Semi-Final (7th Round)

Final

See also
 2022–23 Persian Gulf Pro League
 2022–23 Azadegan League
 2022–23 2nd Division
 2022–23 3rd Division
 2022 Iranian Super Cup

Notes

References

External links 
 Official hazfi-cup website

2022–23 in Iranian football
Hazfi Cup seasons